Courtney Thorne-Smith (born November 8, 1967) is an American actress. She is known for her starring roles as Alison Parker on Melrose Place, Georgia Thomas on Ally McBeal, Cheryl Mabel in According to Jim and her recurring role on Two and a Half Men as Lyndsey McElroy.

Early life
Thorne-Smith was born in San Francisco, California, and grew up in Menlo Park, a suburb south of San Francisco. Her father, Walter Smith, was a computer market researcher, and her mother, Lora Thorne, was a therapist. They divorced when Courtney was seven years old and she lived with both parents at different stages. She has an older sister, Jennifer, who is an advertising executive. She attended Menlo-Atherton High School, in Atherton, California, and graduated from Tamalpais High School, in Mill Valley, California, in 1985. She also performed with the Ensemble Theater Company in Mill Valley while attending high school.

Career

Films
Thorne-Smith made her first film appearance in the 1986 feature film drama Lucas, alongside Winona Ryder, Corey Haim, and Charlie Sheen. She was also involved in a number of movies in the late 1980s, such as Welcome to 18 (1986), Revenge of the Nerds II: Nerds in Paradise (1987), Summer School (1987), and Side Out (1990). In 1998, she starred in the box office flop Chairman of the Board with Carrot Top. In 2009, she appeared in Sorority Wars.

Television
She appeared on a few mid-1980s television series such as Growing Pains and the short-lived Fast Times, as well as made-for-television movies including The Thanksgiving Promise and Infidelity before landing a regular role in the short-lived sitcom Day by Day with Douglas Sheehan, Linda Kelsey and Julia Louis-Dreyfus. In 1990, she was featured in six episodes of L.A. Law as Laker Girl Kimberly Dugan.

Her first notable starring television role was as Alison Parker on Melrose Place from 1992 to 1997. During this time, in 1995, she starred in a made-for-television movie Beauty's Revenge which was also marketed in CD and DVD form as "Midwest Obsession". Following this, she went on to play Georgia Thomas on Ally McBeal from 1997 to 2000. Thorne-Smith originally auditioned for the title role in the show, which ultimately went to Calista Flockhart. Her character was written out of Ally McBeal at the beginning of season four in 2000, though she returned for occasional guest appearances afterwards. She later said that she left the show in part because of the pressure to stay thin. "I started undereating, overexercising, pushing myself too hard and brutalizing my immune system," she told US Weekly. "The amount of time I spent thinking about food and being upset about my body was insane."

From 2001 to 2009, she starred as Cheryl on According to Jim. In 2007, her real-life pregnancy was hidden on the show at first, but was then written into the plot. On February 18, 2010, she signed on to play Alan Harper (Jon Cryer)'s girlfriend, Lyndsey McElroy, in season seven of Two and a Half Men. She appeared in 52 episodes from season seven through twelve.

Starting in 2017, Thorne-Smith has starred in a series of television films, the Emma Fielding Mysteries based on the novels by Dana Cameron. Three entries have been telecast on the Hallmark Movies & Mysteries channel as of 2019.

Writing
On September 18, 2007, Thorne-Smith's novel, Outside In, was published by Broadway Books in New York.

Spokeswoman
In 1997, she became a spokeswoman for Almay cosmetics, being the face of their new "Skin Stays Clean" line of make-up. She is also a spokeswoman for the Atkins diet.

Personal life
In the early 1990s, Thorne-Smith dated Andrew Shue, her on-screen lover from Melrose Place. In June 2000, the actress married geneticist Andrew Conrad; the couple divorced in January 2001.

On January 1, 2007, she married Roger Fishman, president of the marketing firm the Zizo Group and author of the book What I Know. On January 11, 2008, at age 40, she gave birth to their son, Jacob Emerson Fishman.

Filmography

Film

Television

Awards and nominations

References

External links
 
 

1967 births
Living people
20th-century American actresses
21st-century American actresses
Female models from California
American film actresses
American television actresses
American voice actresses
Actresses from San Francisco
People from Menlo Park, California
Tamalpais High School alumni